Interceptor Micros, also known as Interceptor Software and later as Interceptor Group, was a British developer/publisher of video games for various 8-bit and 16-bit computer systems popular in Western Europe during the eighties and early nineties.

In addition to publishing games and utilities under the Interceptor label the company ran a tape and later disc duplication business, a print shop and associated graphic design studio, manufactured dual size cassette tape cases under the Compact Case Company brand and published budget software under the Players and Players Premier labels, and a few full-price titles under the premium Pandora label.

The company was owned and operated by father and son team Julian and Richard Jones, out of various locations in and around the small town of Tadley, near Basingstoke in Hampshire, England. At the height of its success the company employed around thirty people, but fell victim to the 90's video game decline, and went out of business in the early nineties.

Early days 
Richard and Julian's first foray into the computer games business is documented on the official Llamasoft web site with The Joneses and Jeff Minter forming a partnership in 1982. Although the Llamasoft account of the parties' short relationship and the events surrounding the dissolution of the partnership reflect Jeff Minter and his family's opinions, the key facts and dates do not seem to be in dispute. The Jones' and Minters' short-lived partnership ended in September 1982. History has shown that neither parties' interest in the business suffered from the split, with Jeff retaining the Llamasoft name and the Joneses forming Interceptor. The company released several clones of arcade games but decided to focus on developing more original titles, as stricter copyright laws meant the clones could not be sold in the USA.

The Interceptor Label 
The following titles were published under the Interceptor label:

 After Shock
 Aquanaut
 Asiento
 Assembler 64
 Azimuth 3000
 Bandana City 
 Big Ben
 Bigtop Barney
 Break Fever (C64)
 BurgerTime (C64)
 Caverns of Sillahc
 China Miner
 Crazy Kong 64
 Crystals of Carus
 Cuddly Cuburt
 Defender 64
 Forest at the World's End
 Frogger 64
 Front Line
 Get Off My Garden!
 Guzzler 
 The Heroes Of Karn
 The Empire of Karn
 Jewels of Babylon
 LA Police Dept.
 Melonmania
 Message from Andromeda
 Micro Rescue
 Missile Command
 Panic 64
 Quango
 Scramble 64
 Siren City
 Spider and the Fly
 Spriteman 64
 Star Trek
 Sword of Kings
 Tales of the Arabian Nights
 The Zacaron Mystery
 Token of Ghall
 Trollie Wallie
 Vortex Raider
 Wallie Goes To Rhymeland (C64)
 Warlord
 Where's my Bones?
 Wheelin' Wallie (C64)
 Wild Ride (C64)
 Wunda Walter (Vic 20)

The Players and Players Premier labels 
From 1986 to 1991 Players issued budget-priced  tape-based games for various 8-bit platforms. In addition some titles were released for the Atari ST and Amiga platforms on disc at  under the Smash 16 and Players Gold labels. The titles competed against budget software pioneer Mastertronic, and later Codemasters and others in an increasingly crowded budget software marketplace.

Players packaging was bright and colourful. The original concept was designed by Michael Wood, an artist and designer and the then Studio Manager at Interceptor. Most of the packaging artwork at the time was designed by Michael Wood who had several artists working with him. The designs were worked up as finished pieces by air brush artists such as Peter Austin.

The label's most successful and best-known releases were the Joe Blade series of games (1987–1989), but Players and Players Premier released over 100 titles across various platforms.

Players original titles included Anfractuos, Auriga, Auto Zone, Big Top Barney, Bubble Trouble, Cagara, Cerberus, The Claws of Despair, Clean Up Time, Crime Busters, Cybernation, Denizen, Desert Hawk, Deviants, Dizzy Dice, Doodlebug, Elektrix, European Soccer Challenge, Fungus, Fruity, Joe Blade, Joe Blade II, Journey to the Centre of Eddie Smith's Head, Killapede, LA Drugs Bust, Lop Ears, Matt Lucas, Metal Army, Miami Cobra GT, Nuclear Heist, Psycho City, Radius, Reflex, Riding the Rapids, Ronald Rubberduck, The Serf's Tale, Shanghai Karate, Shanghai Warriors, Shrewsbury Key, Skateboard Construction System, Street Gang, Super Nova, Swamp Fever, Sword Slayer, Tanium, Thing!, Toadforce, Tomcat, Turbo Kart Racer, Varmit, Xanthius, and The Zacaron Mystery.

Players Premier original titles included Assault Course, Cobra Force, Deadly Evil, Elven Warrior, Havoc, Hawk Storm, Iron Soldier, Joe Blade III, Lost Caves, Mig Busters, Moving Target, Mutant Fortress, Operation Hanoi, Outlaw, Prison Riot, The Race, Roadburner, Saigon Combat Unit, Shark, 3D Snooker, Solar Empire, Spooked, Steel Eagle, Street Cred Boxing, Street Cred Football, Subway Vigilante, Super League, Task Force, Turbo Master, Velocipede, Velocipede II, War Machine, and World Cup Challenge.

In addition, both labels re-released various full price titles and various games and demos for magazine cover-mounted tapes, which Interceptor duplicated for various computer magazines.

The Pandora label 
In 1987 Interceptor launched Pandora, a new premium-priced label. Pandora released several games for 8- and 16-bit computers. Its first and most successful title was Into the Eagle's Nest, a Gauntlet style burst-scroller set in a Nazi occupied castle. Other titles included Galdregon's Domain (1988), Xenomorph (1990), Outlands (1989) and Debut (1990). It is believed Debut (a complex planet simulator coupled with a side-scroller action element) was one of the last titles to be published under the Pandora label, in December 1990.

The Fun Factory label 
In 1991 and 1992, during the waning days of the company several Atari ST and Amiga titles were released under the Fun Factory Brand. Titles included Twin Turbos (1991), Rebellion (1992), Slackskin and Flint (1992).

People 
Richard Jones was the public face of the company, and all published titles credited him as producer. Due to his youth, ambition and love of fast cars he often appeared on local television and in the papers during the early years. However, Julian was the company mainstay, working long hours, often on the factory floor, building the company.

Interceptor worked with various programmers, artists, and musicians over the years, relying mostly on freelance talent but also employing a number of up and coming in-house coders.

Foremost amongst the in-house programmers were Andrew Challis and Kevin Parker. Apart from developing original titles and porting existing games to other platforms they also developed custom "loaders" and produced the tape masters for the duplication of Interceptor and other companies titles. Interceptor pioneered "loada-games" across multiple platforms, not just the C64 (see the Spectrum version of Joe Blade 2). These were a series of mini games that you could play while the main game continued to load from tape. While technically clever, this occasionally resulted in customers returning product mistaking the loada-game for the advertised content.

Other in-house developers included Andrew Severn (last spotted as producer of Gun for Nethersoft), Martin (Jabba) Severn (last spotted working for Pumpkin Studios), Gary Biasillo, Steve Briggs, Chris Johnson (who later worked for SEGA in San Francisco and as a Lead Producer at Zynga), Mike Brown, Paul Griffiths, Robin Chapman and Colin Swinbourne (last spotted at Nice Tech). Brian Leake and Mark Davidson, who briefly worked on-site during the development of Debut, followed their careers in the USA; Brian was last spotted at The Walt Disney Company in California, and Mark at Destineer in North Carolina.

Prolific freelance Interceptor programmers Richard Robinson & Keith Harvey (AKA 'Howlin' Mad', also known as 'Mirai') went on to form the multimedia futurist band "Intelligentsia" in Tokyo, and Earth Academy Records in London, both working in TV Media and the progressive arts.

References 

Defunct video game companies of the United Kingdom
Software companies of the United Kingdom